KILR (1070 kHz) is a commercial AM radio station serving the Estherville, Iowa area as well as the Iowa Great Lakes region.  The station primarily broadcasts a talk radio format.  KILR is licensed to Jacobson Broadcasting Company, Inc., which also owns sister station KILR-FM. The AM-FM studios, transmitter and towers are located northeast of Estherville along Iowa Highway 4.

History

The station first signed on in December 1967 as a daytimer with 250 watts.

Expanded Band assignment
On March 17, 1997, the Federal Communications Commission (FCC) announced that eighty-eight stations had been given permission to move to newly available "Expanded Band" transmitting frequencies, ranging from 1610 to 1700 kHz, with KILR authorized to move from 1070 to 1690 kHz. However, the station never procured the Construction Permit needed to implement the authorization, so the expanded band station was never built

References

External links
 
 
 
FCC History Cards for KILR (covering 1965–1980)

ILR
Radio stations established in 1967
1967 establishments in Iowa
News and talk radio stations in the United States